Pulcheria may refer to:

 Pulcheria (daughter of Theodosius I) (385–386), daughter of Roman Emperor Theodosius I and Roman Empress Aelia Flaccilla
 Pulcheria (398 or 399 – 453), daughter of Eastern Roman Emperor Arcadius and Empress Aelia Eudoxia
 Pulcheria (moth)